Mona Kristina Wahlman (24 January 1935 – 12 January 2021), better known by her stage name Mona Malm, was a Swedish film, stage, and television actress. Born in 1935 to Harald Ericsson and Inez Malmberg, she began her career with the Swedish Royal Dramatic Theater in 1957.

Malm died in hospital on 12 January 2021, at the age of 85.

Selected filmography
 Love Wins Out (1949)
 Young Summer (1954)
 The Yellow Squadron (1954)
 The Girl in the Rain (1955)
 Smiles of a Summer Night (1955)
 Mother Takes a Vacation (1957)
 The Seventh Seal (1957)
 Woman in a Fur Coat (1958)
 Fridolf Stands Up! (1958)
 Rider in Blue (1959)
 Siska (1962)
 All These Women (1964)
 Nightmare (1965)
 Heja Roland! (1966)
 Fanny and Alexander (1982)
 Nånting levande åt Lame-Kal (1988)
 The Best Intentions (1992)
 The Tattooed Widow (1998)
 After the Wedding (2006)

References

External links

1935 births
2021 deaths
Swedish film actresses
Swedish stage actresses
Actresses from Stockholm
Eugene O'Neill Award winners
Litteris et Artibus recipients
20th-century Swedish actresses